Vaomua Laloifi (born 24 July 1993) is an Australian rules footballer playing for the Carlton Football Club in the AFL Women's (AFLW). Laloifi was drafted by Carlton with their sixth selection and fifty-second overall in the 2019 AFL Women's draft. She made her debut against  at Ikon Park in the opening round of the 2020 season.

Laloifi was born in Samoa and raised in New Zealand to the age of 16

and is the first Samoan born player in the history of the AFLW.

References

External links 

1993 births
Living people
Carlton Football Club (AFLW) players
Australian rules footballers from Victoria (Australia)
Samoan players of Australian rules football